Kenny Joelle Tete (born 9 October 1995) is a Dutch professional footballer who plays as a right back for  club Fulham and the Netherlands national team.

Club career

Ajax
Tete was born in Amsterdam where he grew up and played for AFC DWS and AVV Zeeburgia before he was recruited into the Ajax Academy in 2005 at the age of 10. The 2011–12 season saw Tete playing for the Ajax B1 team, the second highest youth level in the academy, as a right back, and helping his side to clinch the B-Juniors Eredivisie title. He signed his first professional contract with Ajax on 20 July 2012, binding him to the Amsterdam club until 30 June 2015. He spent his first year as a professional playing for the Ajax A1 youth team, without receiving any call-ups to the first team. The following season saw Tete, alongside fellow academy player Riechedly Bazoer, receive his first call-up to the first team which participated in the pre-season training camp in Austria. Tete appeared in his first match for the first team in a pre-season  friendly match against SDC Putten on 29 June 2013. The match ended in a 4–1 away victory for Ajax, with Tete coming on as a substitute for Ruben Ligeon in the 45th minute.

He made his professional debut that season in the Eerste Divisie, the 2nd tier of professional football in the Netherlands, playing for the recently promoted reserves team Jong Ajax, in what would be the team's first-ever appearance in that division, against Telstar on 5 August 2013. The match ended in a 2–0 victory for Jong Ajax at the Amsterdam ArenA. Having appeared on the bench for the first team during the 2013–14 season, it wasn't until the second half of the 2014–15 season that Tete would make his debut for the first team in an official match, appearing in the 1–0 home loss to AZ Alkmaar on 5 February 2015 as a 69th-minute substitute. Tete went on to make 55 appearances for Ajax, including helping them reach the 2017 Europa League Final.

Lyon
On 10 July 2017, Tete was acquired by French side Lyon for a fee believed to be around €3m. Tete scored his first goal for Lyon in a 3–3 draw against Bordeaux in Ligue 1 play on 19 August 2017.

In total, Tete would go on to make 82 appearances for the club in just over three years with Lyon, prominently featuring in their run to the semi-finals of the UEFA Champions League during the 2019–20 season.

Fulham
On 10 September 2020, Premier League club Fulham confirmed the signing of Tete from Lyon on a four-year deal with the option of a further year. He was given the number 2 shirt. Tete made his debut in a 1–0 win against Ipswich Town in the EFL Cup second round. He scored his first goal for Fulham in a 7–0 win at Reading on 11 January 2022.

In Fulham's opening match of the 2022–23 Premier League season, Tete provided the assist for Aleksandar Mitrović's opening goal in a 2–2 home draw against Liverpool.

International career
On 25 October 2011, Tete made his debut for the Netherlands national under-17 team in a UEFA European Under-17 Championship qualifying match against Bosnia and Herzegovina, which ended in a 3–0 win for the Dutch. He made two further appearances during the qualifying rounds but was not included in the final 22-man squad which clinched the 2012 UEFA European Under-17 Championship in Slovakia.

Tete received his first under-19 call-up when he was named in the squad for the 2013 UEFA European Under-19 Championship. He appeared in all three group stage matches. The team defeated hosts Lithuania 3–2 in the opening match but lost their next two matches against Portugal and Spain, failing to advance past the group stage.

Tete received his first call up to the senior Netherlands team in August 2015. Tete played his first cap for the Dutch national team on 10 October against Kazakhstan.

Personal life
Tete was born and raised in Amsterdam to a father from Beira, Mozambique and a mother from Nias, Indonesia. His father Miguel Tete had relocated to the Netherlands with his family at age 5 during the Mozambican War of Independence, and is a former European heavyweight kickboxing champion, who works at The Bulldog coffeeshop on the Leidseplein in downtown Amsterdam.

Career statistics

Club

International

Honours
Ajax
UEFA Europa League runner-up: 2016–17

Fulham
EFL Championship: 2021–22

Netherlands U17
UEFA European Under-17 Championship: 2012

References

External links

Profile at the Fulham F.C. website
 

1995 births
Living people
Footballers from Amsterdam
Dutch footballers
Association football defenders
AFC Ajax players
Jong Ajax players
Olympique Lyonnais players
Fulham F.C. players
Eredivisie players
Eerste Divisie players
Ligue 1 players
Championnat National 2 players
Premier League players
English Football League players
Netherlands youth international footballers
Netherlands under-21 international footballers
Netherlands international footballers
Dutch expatriate footballers
Expatriate footballers in England
Expatriate footballers in France
Dutch expatriate sportspeople in England
Dutch expatriate sportspeople in France
Dutch people of Indonesian descent
Dutch people of Mozambican descent